The Castle of Kars is a former fortification located in Kars, Turkey. It is also known under the name Iç Kale ("Central/Inner Castle", "Citadel").

It was first built during the rule of the Armenian Bagratid dynasty and then rebuilt in 1153 by Firuz Akay Commissioned by Sultan Melik Izzeddin Saltuk II.  The outer walls surrounding the city were built in the 12th century. The castle, which was destroyed by Timur in 1386, was rebuilt again in 1579 by Lala Mustafa Pasha, who came to Kars ordered by the Ottoman Sultan Murat III.

It is said in the Ottoman sources that the castle was rebuilt with the help of one hundred thousand soldiers and workers. In 1606, the castle was destroyed by the Iranian Shah Abbas I, and in 1616 and in 1636 it was restored twice and new elements were added to it. The castle was badly damaged after the occupation of the Russians after the Ottoman-Russian War of 1877-1878, and partially changed after 40 years of occupation. The walls of the Castle of Kars were made of basalt masonry.

Layout
The castle consisted of two sections, the internal and the external castles. The external walls were made of five layers. In addition, there were deep trenches made in front of it. The main castle looks to the east. The planning of the walls of the external castle is not quite quadrangle. The length of the castle's perimeter makes , it was supported with 22 watchtowers, of which only seven remained intact until today.

The castle has four gates. The "Su Kapısı" (literally: Water Gate) or "Çeribaşı Kapısı" is situated in the west, "Kagizman Kapısı" orta "Orta Kapı" in the south and "Behram Kapı" in the east. The main gate located in the north opens up to a chasm in front of the castle.

The castle's watchtower can be accessed by climbing the stairs or along the stone paved road.

Just inside the main entrance is a shrine containing the tomb of Jelal Baba who died during the Mongolian invasion in 1239. Within the castle are military lodgings, an ammunition depot, and a small mosque that was rebuilt in the 1990s.

Today, the castle is administered by the Ministry of Culture and Tourism.

Cultural events
In 2005, the castle hosted a music concert by Turkish pop singer Sezen Aksu attended by around 25,000 people.

During the Islamic fasting month of Ramadan in 2011, a Mevlevi Sama ceremony was held for the first time at the castle.

References

External links
 Lonelyplanet.com Kars Castel
 Photographic survey of the Castle at Kars 
 60+ pictures of the citadel
 Kars Castle Trip 

Buildings and structures in Kars
Kars
Kars
Buildings and structures completed in 1153
Anatolian Beyliks architecture
Tourist attractions in Kars Province
Music venues in Turkey

tr:Kars#Kars Kalesi